Spencer Henry Crawley (born 5 August 1987) is co-founder and General Partner at firstminute capital, a $320m venture capital firm based in London, investing across Europe and North America.

In 2020, Crawley and his co-founder Brent Hoberman launched firstminute capital's second fund, taking firstminute's investor base to over 100 unicorn founders.

Spencer started his career at Goldman Sachs in Moscow in the Fixed Income, Currencies and Commodities division, before becoming the first hire at DMC Partners, a Special Opportunities fund spun out of Goldman Sachs.

References

External links

1987 births
Living people
People from Westminster
People educated at Harrow School
Alumni of Exeter College, Oxford
English cricketers
Oxford University cricketers